WHKB (102.3 FM, "K-Bear 102") is a radio station broadcasting a country music format. The studios are at 313 E. Montezuma, Houghton. It shares this location with its sister stations, WOLV and WCCY.

Licensed to Houghton, Michigan, it first began broadcasting under the WAAH call sign.

References
Michiguide.com - WHKB History

External links

HKB
Country radio stations in the United States
Radio stations established in 1990